Vincent L. Leibell (December 10, 1883 – September 22, 1968) was a United States district judge of the United States District Court for the Southern District of New York.

Education and career

Born in New York City, New York, Leibell received a Master of Arts degree from St. Francis Xavier College in 1905 and a Bachelor of Laws from Fordham University School of Law in 1908. He was in private practice in New York City from 1909 to 1936.

Federal judicial service

On June 8, 1936, Leibell was nominated by President Franklin D. Roosevelt to a seat on the United States District Court for the Southern District of New York vacated by Judge Francis A. Winslow. Leibell was confirmed by the United States Senate on June 16, 1936, and received his commission on June 20, 1936. He assumed senior status on January 1, 1954, serving in that capacity until his death on September 22, 1968, in New York City.

Family

Leibell was the grandfather of former New York State Senator Vincent Leibell.

References

Sources
 

1883 births
1968 deaths
Fordham University School of Law alumni
Judges of the United States District Court for the Southern District of New York
United States district court judges appointed by Franklin D. Roosevelt
20th-century American judges